In the Land of the Blind the Blue Eye Man is King is a painting by Deborah Grant. It is in the collection of the Nasher Museum of Art in Durham, North Carolina in the United States.

Description

This large scale, multi-panel, colorful painting depicts the aftermath of Hurricane Katrina. Starting from the left panel:
 Panel 1: A blue man on a horse represents Federal Emergency Management Agency (FEMA). A black creature stands in the foreground. An airplane flies in the sky, representing when President George W. Bush flew over the area after the hurricane. 
 Panel 2: Various popular culture icons and symbols float throughout the panel, including the Quaker Oats man, who represents the Quakers who are anti-slavery. Other subjects include a skull, a chair, rabbits, cats, a helicopter, a snake, and a menorah. 
 Panel 3: A large black cloud on the top of the panel connects Panel 2 and 3. Various dark figures are dispersed throughout the panel, many with hats on, representing FEMA. 
 Panel 4: More shadowy figures are represented in this panel, as well houses, fighting dogs, and a naked woman. 
 Panel 5: A large house comprises the majority of the panel, with a FEMA figure coming out the front. Figures walk up a ladder into the house.

History

This painting was purchased from Grant in 2008 by Steve Turner Contemporary. In 2013, it was purchased by the Nasher with funding from JoAnn and Ronald Busuttil.

Interpretation

This piece is part of Grant's body of work that she calls "random select." To create these works, she takes her own personal life experiences and blends them with historical moments and popular culture. This piece was inspired by the work of Bill Traylor. As a homage to him, Grant created the series, which this painting is a part of, titled By the Skin of Our Teeth.

References

External links
Art Los Angeles Contemporary (ALAC) with Director Tim Flemin which includes remarks about this artwork during its tenure at Steve Turner Contemporary

2007 paintings
Birds in art
Horses in art
Skulls in art
Cats in art
Snakes in art
Rabbits and hares in art